The Personal Property Security Act ("PPSA") is the name given to each of the statutes passed by all common law provinces, as well as the territories, of Canada that regulate the creation and registration of security interests in all personal property within their respective jurisdictions.

It is similar in structure to Article 9 of the Uniform Commercial Code in the United States, but there are important differences.

History
The British Sale of Goods Act 1893 was followed closely in Canada in the first half of the twentieth century. In the 1970s it was noticed in Ontario that the law of contract had departed from the 1893 Act. To remedy this shortcoming, the Law Reform Commission proposed a new regime, which was duly enacted by the provincial government as the Uniform Sale of Goods Act.

PPSA regime
The legislation that implemented the PPSA scheme was first introduced in Ontario, followed by the remaining provinces and territories (which followed a newer uniform model with notable differences). The Atlantic provinces, together with the Northwest Territories and Nunavut, have fully computerized registries, while the others have varying degrees of electronic and paper registration. The following is a brief outline of how the regime generally works.

Personal property subject to the Act
The scope of the Act is extremely broad, as it is concerned with every transaction which in substance creates a security interest, without regard to its form and without regard to the person who has title to the collateral. There are small differences between the provinces as to how far this extends, but the concept is basically the same. That said, however, there are some items that are specifically excluded:

 liens
 interests in annuities and insurance policies
 interests in land (other than interests arising under a license), including leases
 assignments for the general benefit of creditors
 interests in any compensation for labour or personal services

Personal property is classified into the following categories:

 goods (further classified into consumer goods, equipment and inventory)
 instruments
 documents of title
 chattel paper (including leases and conditional sales contracts)
 securities
 money
 intangibles (licenses and any other matter not included above)

Creation of security interests
Security interests are created through attachment, which can be followed on by perfection.

Attachment occurs when

 value is given,
 the debtor has rights in the collateral, and
 it is enforceable against third parties.

Perfection can occur by possession of the collateral, or by registration. In certain circumstances, possession can be considered to be the superior form of perfection.

Purchase money security interests (PMSIs)
A PMSI is a special type of security interest taken in collateral by a party who gives value for the purpose of enabling the debtor to acquire rights in the collateral. Some examples are:

Creation of "super-priorities"
In specified circumstances, PPSA registrants can obtain "super-priority" status over other secured parties, when the following steps are taken:

The PPSA and land
PPSA security interests can have priority over real property security interests against fixtures, when the secured party registers notice against the land at the local registry or land titles office. Where attachment occurs before the affixation to the land, the interest will have priority, However, where attachment occurs after affixation, the interest is subordinate unless where the debtor otherwise consents.

Other intersections can also occur with interests in land. For example, a lender that grants a mortgage over a rental property will also register a PPSA security interest against the rents being generated, in order to attorn the rents in the event the mortgage goes into default.

Priorities of security interests
In the absence of any other special priority rules, the general order of priority is as follows:

Regime under Québec legislation
For moveable property in Québec, secured creditors create their security interests  by way of hypothec through the Registre des droits personnels et réels mobiliers (RDPRM).

Security interests created under Federal legislation
Federal legislation has also created certain security interests that may take precedence over provincial legislation. They notably include:
Bank Act security for loans granted by banks
interests in patents, copyrights and trademarks
interests in railway and rolling stock
federal property
matters relating to Indians and Indian lands
deemed trusts under taxation laws
priorities of claims under bankruptcy and insolvency laws

Conflicts between provincial PPSAs and federal legislation
S. 89(1) of the Indian Act governs the application of security interests on reserves:

Recent jurisprudence has tended to restrict how this provision should be applied.

There can also be complex interplay with security interests under admiralty law.

Resources by province

Notable cases
 Bank of Montreal v. Innovation Credit Union

Documents
John R. Sandrelli, Christopher J. Ramsay and Anjili I. Bahadoorsingh,Remedies under Security Interests in Canada: An Overview (2002-09-18)
Roderick J.Wood,The Concept of a Security Interest: The Canadian Experience (2011-08-18)

References

Insolvency law of Canada
Canadian business law